Pedro David Brazão Teixeira (born 30 December 2002) is a Portuguese professional footballer who plays as a midfielder for Famalicão.

Career
Brazão began playing football in Portugal, before moving with his mother to France.

Nice
In 2017, he signed with the youth academy of Nice. On 5 April 2019, he signed his first professional contract with the club. He made his professional debut for Nice in a 1–0 Ligue 1 loss to Caen on 20 April 2019.

Lausanne-Sport (loan)
During the 2020–21 season, he was on loan at Lausanne-Sport in Switzerland.

Famalicão
On 18 August 2021, he returned to Portugal and signed a five-year contract with Famalicão.

References

External links
 
 
 
 ZeroZero Profile
 

2002 births
Living people
Footballers from Lisbon
Association football midfielders
Portuguese footballers
Portugal youth international footballers
Portuguese sportspeople of Cape Verdean descent
OGC Nice players
FC Lausanne-Sport players
F.C. Famalicão players
Ligue 1 players
Swiss Super League players
Championnat National 3 players
Primeira Liga players
Portuguese expatriate footballers
Portuguese expatriates in France
Portuguese expatriate sportspeople in Switzerland
Expatriate footballers in France
Expatriate footballers in Switzerland